Crowcroft is a small hamlet just outside Leigh Sinton in Worcestershire, England. The main industry for the area is fruit growing, particularly for local cider and perry businesses. Crowcroft has been the site of a traditional annual bonfire for many years.

Hamlets in Worcestershire